The commune of Songa is a commune of Bururi Province in south-western Burundi. The capital lies at Songa.

Personalities
Gilbert Tuhabonye (b. 1974), Burundian-American philanthropist and sportsman

References

Communes of Burundi
Bururi Province